Chitti is a fictional character and the primary protagonist of the Enthiran film series. The character was portrayed by Rajinikanth in Enthiran, 2.0  and as a cameo in Ra.One. Chitti was imagined, created and developed by S. Shankar.

Concept and creation 

The visual appearance of Chitti was based on the G.I. Joe action figures. For Chitti's 2.0 version look, its hair was spiked and brown coloured lenses were used for its eyes, whereas for its "good robot" look, green coloured lenses were used. The wig used for Chitti's 2.0 look had a silver streak in the middle, made out of yak hair, while its leather jacket was designed by Vogt. Suits made of copper were used for Chitti's costume.

Biography

Chitti (played by Rajnikanth) is a humanoid robot created by Dr. Vaseegaran, (also played by Rajinikanth). Dr Vaseegaran, who is specialized in robotics, created Chitti after a decade of unsuccessful attempts and intensive research. Vaseegaran makes Chitti an exact look-alike of himself. The robot is named Chitti, as suggested by Vaseegaran's mother.

Vaseegaran made Chitti interact with people outside the lab to socialize him with the outside world and saw how he used his intellects and abilities amongst humans. In order for the robot to understand human behavior, Vaseegaran taught the robot about emotions and upgraded the software to give it the ability to comprehend and exhibit human emotions. But then the robot fell in love with the scientist's girlfriend, Sana (played by Aishwarya Rai) and thus it caused conflict between them. Angered by the robot, Vaseegaran chopped the robot into pieces. He was found by Dr. Bohra (played by Danny Denzongpa) and upgraded into advanced version 2.0 with additional software, ‘red chip’ which functions as a destructive program installed in Chitti’s software system. He converts Chitti into a ruthless killer and then Chitti turned into a destructive killing machine and killed Bohra. He then went after Vaseegaran and Sana and crashed their wedding. He showed numerous other powerful abilities including shapeshifting as well as duplicating. However, Vaseegaran managed to defeat and stop Chitti. Since he caused so much damage and destruction to the city, he was de-activated and dismantled. His body parts were then displayed in the museum in the year 2030 as the most advanced humanoid robot ever built.

Chitti reappeared in the film Ra.One in a special non-canon appearance. Rajinikanth did not play Chitti in the film rather the character was computer generated and his look as Chitti was digitally recreated and was used in the film.

Chitti is forced to be reassembled by Dr. Vaseegaran and the Indian Army in order to stop the antagonist, Fifth force, which is controlled by Pakshi Rajan, an ornithologist (played by Akshay Kumar) turned into a vengeful spirit. But Chitti is defeated and destroyed in his original form by the antagonist, which leads his CPU head to be rebooted in another advanced mechanical body, identifying himself as Chitti reloaded version '2.0', and will also fall in love with his female counterpart, the super-android Nila (played by Amy Jackson), also created by Vaseegaran. Alongside Chitti, there is another robot created known as "Kutty" (3.0), which is a microbot capable of shape-shifting.

Powers and abilities

Chitti is described by Vaseegaran as an advanced "andro-humanoid" robot. Over his metallic body, he sports synthetic inorganic skin moulded after Vaseegaran himself. He is designed with a speed capacity of 1 Terahertz (THz) and a memory capacity of 1 Zettabyte.

Initially, Chitti has been programmed with almost all the existing world knowledge managed to put in computable terms in his CPU, thus he is knowledgeable and proficient in all forms of academia, martial arts, communication, creative outlets, athletic skills, and scientific ingenuity. 
Underneath his synthetic skin, he is fire, water, and acid-resistant.

In his original form, he is partially resistant to severe damage such as gunshots, though he can still be damaged or destroyed by properly aimed and adequately forceful attacks such as being chopped with an axe in the joints. Severe electrocution can also overload short-circuit him.  As long as his CPU head is still functioning, Chitti is able to repair or fix back his minor parts such as his eyes. However, for large damage such as limbs being chopped off, he can only put them back in place and function at a much slower speed.

Chitti's eyes are able to not only see and scan his surroundings to extremely acute detail, including X-ray vision, but they can also serve as high-definition projectors. His eyes also allow him to pick up additional skills and literature within seconds. He can also perform virtual phone calls, displaying his caller or receiver through his eyes as a hologram. However, on the downside, the eyes get bleached when exposed to the flashlight.

Chitti has super strength, capable of tossing an accelerating police car above itself, and stamina, while he still has battery charge. Aside from Chitti's strength and durability, his most powerful weapon is his built-in electromagnetic body, which can attract any metallic object and weaponize it. This and his connection to electronic devices give him enhanced technopathy and telekinesis.

Chitti's only known weaknesses are flashing lights from photography or direct sunlight, which causes a "vision bleach" and temporarily distort his sight, and his susceptibility to battery drainage. However, in the case of the latter, he just needs to absorb a bare minimum amount of electric power to recharge himself in a matter of seconds.

References

Further reading

Enthiran
Indian film characters
Fictional androids
Fictional robots
Superhero film characters
Film characters introduced in 2010
Indian superheroes